Hartmut Jörg Heinz Perschau (28 March 1942 – 25 July 2022) was a German politician. He was a member of the Hamburg Parliament from 1974 to 1989, and a member of the European Parliament for Germany from 1989 to 1991.

Perschau died in July 2022, at the age of 72.

References 

1942 births
2022 deaths
MEPs for Germany 1989–1994
Mayors of Bremen
Christian Democratic Union of Germany politicians
20th-century German politicians
Members of the Hamburg Parliament